Russian Winter may refer to:
Winter in Russia, meteorology
"Russian Winter", military significance
 Titled works:
 Songs:
 On Krokus album Headhunter 
 On Bill Callahan album Sewn to the Sky 
 By the Canadian Northern Junk
 By band London: 
 On album The Metal Years
 On album Playa Del Rock 
 Novel (2010)  by Daphne Kalotay
 Russian Winter. Hoarfrost (painting) by Timke
 Russian Winter Meeting,  annual track and field competition